Alex Anderson is the name of:
 Alex Anderson (cartoonist) (1920–2010), American cartoonist
 Alex Anderson (footballer) (1921–1999), Scottish footballer
 Alex Anderson (quilter) (born 1955), American quilter

See also
Alexander Anderson (disambiguation)